Steinbach-Hallenberg is a town in the Schmalkalden-Meiningen district, in Thuringia, Germany. It is situated in the Thuringian Forest, 8 km east of Schmalkalden, and 13 km northwest of Suhl. The former municipalities Altersbach, Bermbach, Oberschönau, Unterschönau, Rotterode and Viernau were merged into Steinbach-Hallenberg in January 2019.

History
From 1868 to 1944, Steinbach-Hallenberg was part of the Prussian Province of Hesse-Nassau.

References

External links
 Homepage of Steinbach-Hallenberg

Schmalkalden-Meiningen